William James Glenson Pullar (c. 1926 – March 30, 1981) was a Canadian football player who played for the Calgary Stampeders. He won the Grey Cup with them in 1948. Pullar previously attended and played football at McGill University for the McGill Redmen.

References

1920s births
Canadian football people from Calgary
Players of Canadian football from Alberta
Calgary Stampeders players
Year of birth uncertain
McGill University alumni
McGill Redbirds football players
1981 deaths